Frederick Theodore Weber  (1883–1956) was an American painter, etcher, and sculptor. Born in Columbia, South Carolina, he traveled abroad as a youth, studying under Ferdinand Humbert and Jean-Paul Laurens at the École des Beaux-Arts in Paris. Active in New York City, he has works in the Metropolitan Museum of Art,  Brooklyn Museum, and the Smithsonian American Art Museum.

References

1883 births
1956 deaths
20th-century American painters
20th-century American sculptors
20th-century American male artists
American alumni of the École des Beaux-Arts
Artists from South Carolina
People from Columbia, South Carolina
Painters from New York City
American expatriates in France